Haghighi is a Persian surname. Notable people with the surname include:

Ali Nobakht Haghighi (born 1948), Iranian nephrologist
Alireza Haghighi (born 1988), Iranian footballer
Mani Haghighi (born 1969), Iranian film director, screenwriter and actor
Mona Zandi Haghighi (born 1972), Iranian film director
Reza Haghighi (born 1989), Iranian footballer

Persian-language surnames